The Glatten (2,505 m) is a mountain of the Schwyzer Alps, overlooking the Klausen Pass in the canton of Uri. It is the tripoint between the valleys Bisistal, Schächental and Urner Boden. The summit consists of a large karstic plateau.

References

External links

Glatten on Hikr

Mountains of the Alps
Mountains of the canton of Uri
Mountains of Switzerland